"Target" is a song by English rock band Embrace and is featured on their number-one charting fifth album, This New Day. It was released 11 September 2006 as the follow-up to the band's official World Cup 2006 Anthem. It didn't repeat the top 3 success of their two recent singles from their album, peaking at #29 in the UK Singles Chart and was their last song to reach the UK top 40.

Track listing
7" ISOM110SST
 "Target"
 "Just Admit It"

CD1 ISOM110MSST
 "Target"
 "Run Away"

CD2 ISOM110SMSST
 "Target"
 "One Luck"
 "Thank God You Were Mean To Me"

2006 singles
Embrace (English band) songs
2006 songs
Independiente (record label) singles
Songs written by Youth (musician)
Songs written by Richard McNamara
Songs written by Danny McNamara